The James Cook University Hospital is a tertiary referral hospital and regional major trauma centre in Middlesbrough, North Yorkshire, England located on the A172 (Marton Road). Having 1,046 beds, it caters for most specialities and forms part of the South Tees Hospitals NHS Foundation Trust, along with the Friarage Hospital in Northallerton.

History
Construction of the hospital began in 1980 on the parkland of the former St Luke's Hospital, Middlesbrough. Officially opened by the Duchess of Kent in November 1981 as a tertiary care centre called South Cleveland Hospital, it later became an extensive hospital with A&E. Its maternity unit was opened by Diana, Princess of Wales in October 1988. The hospital became the James Cook University Hospital in 2001 to reflect the local heritage and growing academic links.

New facilities were procured under a Private Finance Initiative contract to replace Middlesbrough General Hospital, North Riding Infirmary and the neuro-rehabilitation unit at West Lane Hospital in 1999. These new facilities were designed by HLM Architects, built on the site by Mowlem at a cost of £96 million and opened in August 2003.

In April 2012, the hospital became a major trauma centre for Durham, East Cleveland, Tees Valley and North Yorkshire, participating in the wider Northern trauma network.

In May 2012, a £35 million radiotherapy centre opened at the hospital, unveiled by Princess Alexandra.

In November 2012, a new 3T MRI scanner was opened, in the Neurosciences department. This is a partnership between the hospital and Durham University and in addition to clinical work will undertake research into various aspects of cognition.

In May 2014, the James Cook railway station opened adjacent to the hospital. Located on the Esk Valley line, the station provides access to the hospital via the local rail network.

In March 2015, a new purpose-built IVF unit was opened (complete with its own theatre), it now brings all the reproductive medicine services together in one place.

Facilities

James Cook University Hospital specialises in the treatment of cancer, heart conditions and neurosurgery as well as housing the regional neonatal intensive care and spinal injury units. More recent developments include the introduction of advanced cardiac mapping technologies for complex radio frequency ablation, and the development of a highly successful Transcatheter Aortic Valve Intervention programme for patients deemed unfit for conventional cardiac surgery.

The hospital is used to teach clinical medical students from Newcastle University Medical School and Hull York Medical School. The hospital also has strong teaching and research links with the School of Nursing and Health at Teesside University.

The hospital also has a floodlit helipad for use by the Great North and Yorkshire air ambulances during daytime and nighttime hours

See also
List of hospitals in England

References

External links 
 South Tees Hospitals NHS Trust

Hospital buildings completed in 1980
Hospitals in North Yorkshire
NHS hospitals in England
Teaching hospitals in England
Newcastle University
Teesside University
Buildings and structures in Middlesbrough
1980 establishments in England
Hospitals established in 1980